The People's Democratic Republic of Yemen (commonly referred to as South Yemen) became independent as the People's Republic of South Yemen in November 1967, after the British withdrawal from the Federation of South Arabia and the Protectorate of South Arabia. In May 1990, South Yemen unified with the Yemen Arab Republic (commonly referred to as North Yemen) to form the united Republic of Yemen. During the May–July 1994 Civil War, South Yemen seceded from the united Yemen and established the short-lived Democratic Republic of Yemen.

Heads of Party

Heads of State

Heads of Government

Heads of Parliament

See also
President of Yemen
Prime Minister of Yemen

References
Citations

Bibliography

External links
World StatesmenSouth Yemen

s
Yemen

Chairmen of the Presidium of the Supreme People's Council

Government of Yemen
South Yemen
South Yemen